Ashi Tsundue Pema Lhamo (1886–1922) was the first Queen consort of Bhutan.

Early life
Ashi Tsundue Pema Lhamo was born in 1886 in Kurto Khoma, as the daughter of Kunzang Thinley, 18th and 20th Dzongpon of Thimphu, and his wife, Sangay Drolma, a noble lady from Kurto Khoma.

Her father, Kunzang Thinley, was a first cousin of the First Druk Gyalpo, Ugyen Wangchuck (her future husband).

She has an only brother, Ugyen Thinley Dorji (1906–1949), 8th Gangteng Tulku.

She belonged to the Peling and the Nyö lineages.

Marriage and family
She married, as his fourth wife, Gongsar Ugyen Wangchuck. The wedding took place at Wangducholing Palace, Bumthang, in 1901. She was 15 years old.

At first, she was called Maharani in her country.

Her children with the First Druk Gyalpo were:

 Dasho N. Wangchuck (1903–died in infancy).
 HM The Second King (Druk Gyalpo) Jigme Wangchuck (1905–1952).
 HRH Prince (Druk Gyalsey) Gyurme Dorji (1911–1933). Unmarried and without issue.
 HRH Princess (Druk Gyalsem) Kencho Wangmo (1914–ca.1975). Educated at Bumthang Palace School. A great patron of traditional arts and religious institutions, a lyricist and composer of boedra songs. She became a Buddhist nun in later life, and died unmarried at the Jangchubling Monastery.
 HRH Prince (Druk Gyalsey) Karma Thinley Lhundrub (1917–1949), Dronyer. Died unmarried at Jangchubling Monastery (Gangzur).

Queen of Bhutan
Tsundue Pema Lhamo, the first Queen consort of Bhutan, was deeply devoted to Buddhism and was the only woman in the district of Bumthang whose wrist fit Yeshe Tsogyal's bracelet.

She died in April 1922 at Wangducholing Palace.

Ancestry

References

Notes

1886 births
1922 deaths
Bhutanese monarchy
Wangchuck dynasty